Sir Lawrence Wensley Chubb (21 December 1873 – 18 February 1948) was an Anglo-Australian professional Secretary whose work was on environmentalist causes.

Early life
Chubb was born at Lauraville in the Colony of Victoria, the son of Lawrence Wensley Chubb and Esther Lydle Collins. He migrated to England and in 1891 was working as an auctioneer’s clerk and living with an uncle in Southwark who was an undertaker.

Career
In 1895, through the influence of Sir Robert Hunter, Chubb became the first Secretary of the newly formed National Trust and was later called "the first man to make what we call the environment his professional career". 

A knighthood for Chubb was announced in the 1930 New Year Honours, with the citation noting that he had been Secretary of the Commons and Footpaths Preservation Society for thirty-five years and of the National Playing Fields Association since 1928. The knighthood was conferred by George V at Buckingham Palace on 8 March 1930.

In the late 1930s, Chubb became a Patron of the newly-formed Right Book Club, established to act as a counterbalance to the influential Left Book Club.

Personal life
In 1905, at Southwark, Chubb married Gertrude Elizabeth Anthony. With his wife he had a son, also called Lawrence Wensley Chubb, who became a chemical engineer, and a daughter, Gertrude. In October 1939, Chubb and his wife were living at Windrush, Midford, near Bath.

Chubb died in February 1948 at Richmond, Surrey, leaving an estate valued at £9,144.

Publications
The Maintenance of Public Ways (Commons, Open Spaces and Footpaths Preservation Society, 1946)

Notes

1873 births
1948 deaths
Colony of Victoria people
Knights Bachelor
People from Southwark
Australian emigrants to the United Kingdom